Satish Chandra (21 January 1917 – 5 January 1990) was an Indian politician. He was elected to the Lok Sabha, the lower house of the Parliament of India from the Bareilly, Uttar Pradesh  as a member of the Indian National Congress. He was the Deputy Minister for Defence, 1952–1955, Deputy Minister for Production, 1955–1957 and Deputy Minister for Commerce and Industry, 1957–1962 in the Nehru Ministry.

Chandra died on 5 January 1990, at the age of 72.

References

External links
 Official biographical sketch in Parliament of India website

1917 births
1990 deaths
India MPs 1952–1957
India MPs 1957–1962
India MPs 1971–1977
Indian National Congress politicians
Politicians from Bareilly
Lok Sabha members from Uttar Pradesh
Uttar Pradesh MLAs 1952–1957
Indian National Congress politicians from Uttar Pradesh